Pietro Camporese the Elder (1726–1781) was an Italian architect.

Life
Camporese was born and died in Rome, the first of a family of architects active in the city in the 18th and 19th centuries.  His sons Giuseppe and Giulio are recorded as collaborating with their father on the building of the Duomo at Subiaco, and his grandchild Pietro Camporese the Younger (1792–1873), who led the reconstruction of Rome's basilica of San Paolo fuori le Mura.

In 1754 Pietro the elder won second prize for Architecture in the "Concorso Clementino" from Rome's Accademia nazionale di San Luca, where he later became a professor.

His architecture is typical of the eclectic tendency of Roman architects of the late 18th century, before neoclassical architecture (as represented by the styles of his two sons) fully asserted itself.  Pietro Camporese the Elder looked to late Baroque models, though at the same time showed clear influences from Luigi Vanvitelli.

Works
Among the works of Pietro Camporese the elder are:
the completion of the facade of the church of Santa Maria in Aquiro (1774), built in the second order with stilemi resembling those of the 16th century church of Santa Maria dell'Orto in Rome;
 the completion of the facade of the German and Hungarian College in Rome, on via della Scrofa;
 an arch dedicated to pope Pius VI at Subiaco (1789);
 church of Sant'Andrea (cathedral) and Palazzo del Seminario (1766–1789) in Subiaco;
 church of Santa Brigida a Campo de' Fiori in Rome.

Bibliography
 Lucia Frattarelli Fischer, "Camporese", in Dizionario biografico degli italiani, Roma, Istituto della Enciclopedia italiana, 1974, volume XVII (Calvart-Canefri), pp. 587–589.

1726 births
1781 deaths
18th-century Italian architects
Architects from Rome
Date of birth unknown